Härma is a village in Raasiku Parish, Harju County in northern Estonia. It has a population of 132 (as of 1 October 2011).

References

Villages in Harju County